FC Mashynobudivnyk Druzhkivka was a Ukrainian football club from Druzhkivka, Donetsk Oblast.

 
Defunct football clubs in Ukraine
Football clubs in Donetsk Oblast
Association football clubs established in the 1930s
Association football clubs disestablished in 2002
1930s establishments in Ukraine
2002 disestablishments in Ukraine